Roderick Green (born March 16, 1979) is a paralympic athlete from the United States competing mainly in category T44 sprint events.

Roderick has competed in two Paralympics, firstly in 2000 where he won a silver in the 200m and bronze in both the 400m and long jump but could not help the American T46 relay team to a medal.  His second games were in 2004 where despite competing in the 100m long jump and shot put he was unable to add to his tally of medals.

When Green was born he had no right ankle or fibula; his leg was amputated below the knee at age two. In 1997, he graduated from West Monroe High School in West Monroe, Louisiana. He then attended Oklahoma Christian University where he played basketball and in 2002 earned his degree in physical education and nutrition.

References

1979 births
Living people
Paralympic track and field athletes of the United States
Athletes (track and field) at the 2000 Summer Paralympics
Athletes (track and field) at the 2004 Summer Paralympics
Paralympic silver medalists for the United States
Paralympic bronze medalists for the United States
West Monroe High School alumni
Oklahoma Christian University alumni
Oklahoma Christian Eagles basketball players
Medalists at the 2000 Summer Paralympics
American men's basketball players
Paralympic medalists in athletics (track and field)
American male sprinters
Sprinters with limb difference
Paralympic sprinters